The 1988–89 season was Cardiff City F.C.'s 62nd season in the Football League. They competed in the 24-team Division Three, then the third tier of English football, finishing sixteenth.

Players
First team squad.

League standings

Results by round

Fixtures and results

Third Division

Source

League Cup

FA Cup

Welsh Cup

Sherpa Van Trophy

UEFA Cup Winners Cup

See also
List of Cardiff City F.C. seasons

References

Bibliography

Welsh Football Data Archive

1988-89
1988–89 Football League Third Division by team
Welsh football clubs 1988–89 season